Robert T. Bronzan (January 11, 1919 – December 10, 2006) was an American football player and coach.
He served as the head football coach at San Jose State University from 1950 to 1956, compiling a record of 32–30–5. He played college football at San Jose State from 1936 to 1939 and later served as an assistant coach there from 1946 to 1949.

Head coaching record

References

External links
 

1919 births
2006 deaths
San Jose State Spartans athletic directors
San Jose State Spartans football coaches
San Jose State Spartans football players
Philadelphia Eagles coaches
People from Kern County, California
Players of American football from California